The Estadio Miguel Alemán Valdés is a multi-use stadium in Celaya, Guanajuato. Mexico.  It is currently used mostly for football matches and is the home stadium of Club Celaya. The stadium holds 23,369 people and opened in 1954.

It is named for Miguel Alemán Valdés, President of the Republic from 1946 to 1952.

On June 2, 2016, it was announced that the stadium was renamed in honour of former Real Madrid player Emilio Butragueño, who played the last three years of his career for Atlético Celaya, it was later denied by Ramón Lemus Muñoz, the Municipal president of Celaya.

References

Monumental Emilio Butragueno
Sports venues in Guanajuato
Celaya
1954 establishments in Mexico
Sports venues completed in 1954